Mehal Amhara Sayint (Amharic:መሐል አምሓራ ሣይንት )s one of the woredas in the Amhara Region of Ethiopia. It is named after the historic district of Sayint. Part of the Debub Wollo Zone, Mehal Sayint is bordered on the south by Debre Sina, and on the north and east by Sayint. Mehal Amhara Sayint was separated from Amhara Sayint.

Demographics
Based on the 2007 national census conducted by the Central Statistical Agency of Ethiopia (CSA), this woreda has a total population of 73,432, of whom 36,369 are men and 37,063 women. The majority of the inhabitants said they practiced Ethiopian Orthodox Christianity, with 98.8% reporting that as their religion, while 1.2% of the population were Muslim.

Notes

Districts of Amhara Region